Isola Rossa in Italian means red island and may refer to:
Isola Rossa (France), municipality in Corsica
Isola Rossa (Trinità d'Agultu e Vignola), town in the Trinità d'Agultu e Vignola municipality, in the north Sardinia
Isola Rossa (Trinità d'Agultu e Vignola), island in the Trinità d'Agultu e Vignola municipality, in the north Sardinia
Isola Rossa (Monte Argentario), a small island next to the south-west coast of the Monte Argentario, Tuscany
Isola Rossa (Teulada, Italy), a small island next to coast of Teulada municipality, in the south Sardinia
Crveni otok, croatian island also called Isola Rossa